Berlinite (aluminium phosphate, chemical formula AlPO4 or Al(PO4)) is a rare high-temperature hydrothermal or metasomatic phosphate mineral. It has the same crystal structure as quartz with a low temperature polytype isostructural with α–quartz and a high temperature polytype isostructural with β–quartz. Berlinite can vary from colorless to greyish or pale pink and has translucent crystals.

It was first described in 1868 for an occurrence in the Västanå iron mine, Scania, Sweden and named for Nils Johan Berlin (1812–1891) of Lund University.

It occurs as a rare mineral in high-temperature hydrothermal or metasomatic deposits.  Associated minerals include  augelite, attakolite, kyanite, pyrophyllite, scorzalite, lazulite, gatumbaite, burangaite, amblygonite, phosphosiderite, purpurite, apatite, muscovite, quartz, hematite in granite pegmatites. It also occurs with alunite, aragonite, collophane, crandallite, francoanellite, gypsum, huntite, hydromagnesite, leucophosphite, nesquehonite, niter, and nitrocalcite in the Paddy's River copper mine in the Brindabella Mountains of Australia.

References

Further reading

Phosphate minerals
Trigonal minerals
Minerals in space group 152 or 154